Andrew Alexander may refer to:

 Andrew Alexander (producer) (born 1944), theatre, film and television producer
 Andrew Alexander (actor), English actor
 Andrew Alexander (journalist) (1935–2015), English journalist
 Andrew Lamar Alexander (born 1940), American politician